The 2020 United States House of Representatives elections in Nebraska was held on November 3, 2020, to elect the three U.S. representatives from the state of Nebraska, one from each of the state's three congressional districts. The elections coincided with the 2020 U.S. presidential election, as well as other elections to the House of Representatives, elections to the United States Senate and various state and local elections.

Overview

District 1

The 1st district is located in eastern Nebraska surrounding Omaha and its suburbs, taking in Lincoln, Bellevue, Fremont, and Norfolk. The incumbent is Republican Jeff Fortenberry, who was re-elected with 60.4% of the vote in 2018.

Republican primary

Candidates

Declared
Jeff Fortenberry, incumbent U.S. Representative

Declined
Nicholas Oviatt, part-time consultant

Results

Democratic primary

Candidates

Declared
Kate Bolz, state senator
Barbara "Babs" Ramsey, security analyst

Endorsements

Results

Libertarian primary

Candidates

Declared
 Dennis B. Grace, U.S. Navy veteran

Results

General election

Predictions

Results

District 2

The 2nd district covers the Omaha metropolitan area, including all of Douglas County, home to the city of Omaha, and suburban parts of western Sarpy County, including La Vista and Papillon. The incumbent is Republican Don Bacon, who was re-elected with 51.0% of the vote in 2018.

Kara Eastman is the Democratic nominee. She started a nonprofit consulting company in 2019, and she was previously the executive director of the Omaha Healthy Kids Alliance. That organization focuses on reducing lead poisoning, and Lee Terry described it as a nonpartisan project. She is a former member of the Board of Governors of Metropolitan Community College.

President Donald Trump endorsed Bacon, and Democratic presidential nominee Joe Biden endorsed Eastman.

Republican primary

Candidates

Declared
Paul Anderson, perennial candidate
Don Bacon, incumbent U.S. Representative

Results

Democratic primary

Candidates

Declared
 Ann Ashford, attorney and wife of former U.S. Representative Brad Ashford
 Kara Eastman, nonprofit executive and nominee for Nebraska's 2nd congressional district in 2018
 Gladys Harrison, general manager of Big Mama's Kitchen

Withdrew
 Morgann Freeman, part-time communications consultant and activist (endorsed Ashford)
 Dustin Sedoris, U.S. Marine Corps veteran (endorsed Eastman)

Declined
 Heath Mello, chief lobbyist for the University of Nebraska system, former state senator, and nominee for mayor of Omaha in 2017
 Denise Blaya Powell, founder of Women Who Run

Endorsements

Results

Libertarian primary

Candidates

Declared
Tyler Schaeffer

Results

General election

Predictions

Polling
Graphical summary

with Ann Ashford

with Gladys Harrison

Endorsements

Results
Despite Democratic Presidential Nominee Joe Biden winning the district by 6.5 points, Bacon defeated Eastman by 4.6 points. Eastman underperformed Biden by over 11 points.

By county

District 3

The 3rd district covers most of the rural western part of the state, and includes Grand Island, Kearney, Hastings, North Platte, Alliance, and Scottsbluff. The incumbent is Republican Adrian Smith, who was re-elected with 76.7% of the vote in 2018.

Republican primary

Candidates

Declared
Larry Lee Scott Bolinger, veteran, graduate from UNO, business owner in property preservation, author of 16 books, and a self-defense instructor
William Elfgren, grocery worker
Arron Kowalski, farmer
Justin Moran, architectural draftsman, firefighter and welder
Adrian Smith, incumbent U.S. Representative

Results

Democratic primary

Candidates

Declared
Mark Elworth, Jr., acting chair of the Cannabis Rights Party of Nebraska, former Legal Marijuana Now nominee for president in 2020

Results

Libertarian primary

Candidates

Declared
 Dustin C. Hobbs, reality television show participant

Results

General election

Predictions

Results

Notes

Partisan clients

References

External links
 
 
  (State affiliate of the U.S. League of Women Voters)
 

Official campaign websites for 1st district candidates
 Kate Bolz (D) for Congress 
 Jeff Fortenberry (R) for Congress
 Dennis B. Grace (L) for Congress 

Official campaign websites for 2nd district candidates
 Don Bacon (R) for Congress
 Kara Eastman (D) for Congress 

Official campaign websites for 3rd district candidates
 Adrian Smith (R) for Congress 

2020
Nebraska
United States House of Representatives